The Women's Aerials event in freestyle skiing at the 2002 Winter Olympics in Salt Lake City, United States took place on 16 and 18 February at Park City.

Results

Qualification
The qualification was held on 16 February at 10:00. The top 12 advanced to the final.

Final
The final was held  on 18 February at 12:00.

References

Women's freestyle skiing at the 2002 Winter Olympics
Women's events at the 2002 Winter Olympics